Théophile Barrau  (1848–1913) was a French sculptor.

Barrau was born in Carcassonne.  He was a student of Alexandre Falguière and started at the Salon in 1874. He received awards in 1879, 1880, 1889, and became a Chevalier of the Legion of Honor in 1892.  He died in Paris.

Main works
 Suzanne, 1895, marble, Musée d'Orsay, Paris.
 Monument aux Morts, 1870, architect : Paul Pujol, Toulouse
 Hommage à Pierre Fermat, marble, Salle des Illustres, Capitole of Toulouse

1848 births
1913 deaths
People from Carcassonne
Chevaliers of the Légion d'honneur
20th-century French sculptors
20th-century French male artists
19th-century French sculptors
19th-century French male artists
French male sculptors